Thomas Angus (born 23 November 1934 – 14 May 1988) was an English first-class cricketer who played for  Middlesex.  His highest score of 18*  came when playing for Middlesex in the match against Kent.  His best bowling of 4/81   came when playing for Middlesex in the match against Oxford University.

He also played 19 Minor Counties Championship games, mostly Middlesex Second XI, but also for Durham.

References

External links
 Cricket Archive Profile

1934 births
1988 deaths
English cricketers
Middlesex cricketers
Durham cricketers